Smart is a surname.

People
Allan Smart (born 1974), Scottish former footballer
Amy Smart (born 1976), American actress and former fashion model
Andrew Smart (born 1986), English footballer
Ben Smart (disappeared 1998), one of the victims of a double murder in New Zealand
Christopher Smart (1722–1771), English poet
Colin Smart (born 1950), English rugby union international
Craig Smart (singer), Canadian singer songwriter
Elizabeth Smart (born 1987), American political activist and child kidnapping victim
Elizabeth Smart (Canadian author) (1913–1986), Canadian poet and novelist
Erinn Smart (born 1980), American fencer, sister of Keeth Smart
Floyd Smart (1894–1955), American athlete
Sir George Thomas Smart (1776–1867), English musician
Irene Smart (1921–2017), American judge and politician
J. J. C. Smart (1920–2012), Scottish professor of philosophy
J. Scott Smart (1902–1960), American actor
Jack Smart (footballer), English footballer in the early part of the 20th century
James H. Smart (1841–1900), American educator and administrator
Jean Smart (born 1950), American actress best known for her role in the TV show Designing Women
Jeffrey Smart, (1921–2013) Australian painter
John Smart (c. 1740–1811), English painter of portrait miniatures
John Elliott Smart (1916–2008), Royal Navy officer in the Second World War
Joseph F. Smart (1870–1938), American politician
Keeth Smart (born 1978), American sabre fencer, first American to be ranked number one in the world (2003)
Keith Smart (born 1964), American basketball player and coach
Kelvin Smart (born 1960), Welsh boxer
Kevin Smart (born 1958), English retired footballer
Kirby Smart (born 1975), American football coach
Marcus Smart (born 1994), American basketball player
Nigel Smart (born 1969), former Australian rules footballer
Nigel Smart (cryptographer) (born 1967), professor of computer science
Pr. Ninian Smart (1927–2001), Scottish Religious Studies academic
Pamela Smart (born 1967), American convicted accomplice to the first-degree murder of her husband
Paul Smart (motorcyclist) (1943–2021), English short circuit motorcycle road racer
Paul Smart (sailor) (1892–1979), American sailor and Olympic champion
Reuben D. Smart (1832–1890), American politician
Richard Smart (actor) (1913–1992), Broadway actor and rancher
Richard Smart (MP) (died 1560), English politician and Member of Parliament
Dr. Richard Smart (viticulturalist) (born 1945), Australian viticulturalist
Roger Smart (born 1943), retired footballer
Sally Smart (born 1960), Australian artist
Shaka Smart (born 1977), American college basketball coach
Tamara Smart (born 2005), English actress
Tanzel Smart (born 1994), American football player
Tim Smart (businessman), British businessman

Fictional characters
Colleen Smart, on the Australian soap opera Home and Away
Maxwell Smart, the protagonist of the American TV series Get Smart

English-language surnames